Macalister Range National Park is a protected area of Queensland in Australia. It is within the locality of Wangetti in the Shire of Douglas and within the Macalister Range locality in the Cairns Region and forms part of the Wet Tropics World Heritage Area.

History 
The national park was established in 2010 and contains  of important cassowary habitat.

References 

National parks of Far North Queensland
Cairns Region
2010 establishments in Australia
Protected areas established in 2010